King Ping may refer to:
King Ping of Zhou (reigned 771–720 BC), king of the Zhou dynasty
King Ping of Chu (r. 528–516 BC), king of the State of Chu
Prince Ping of Liang (r. 137–97 BC), prince of Liang under the Han dynasty
A type of school handball